John Frank Rieley III (November 24, 1942 – April 17, 2015) was an American record producer, songwriter, and disc jockey who managed the Beach Boys between mid-1970 and late 1973. He is credited with guiding them back to popular acclaim and was described by New Statesman as "a radio DJ turned career mentor."

Rieley co-wrote a total of ten songs included on the Beach Boys' albums Surfs  Up (1971), Carl and the Passions – "So Tough" (1972), and Holland (1973). He also sang lead on the Surf's Up track "A Day in the Life of a Tree" and narrated Brian Wilson's fairy tale Mount Vernon and Fairway (1972).

Following his work with the Beach Boys, Rieley collaborated with artists such as Kool & the Gang, Ride, and Jaye Muller (aka Count Jaye). In 1975, Rieley released a solo album, Western Justice. He died in 2015 at the age of 72.

Background
Rieley was born in Milwaukee, Wisconsin.

The Beach Boys
The Beach Boys met Rieley, while promoting their album Sunflower, and hired him as their manager. He wrote and co-wrote lyrics to several of the Beach Boys songs including "Long Promised Road", "Feel Flows", "Sail On, Sailor", "Funky Pretty" and "The Trader". He sang lead vocal on "A Day in the Life of a Tree". He also narrated the bonus disc for the Holland album: "Mt. Vernon and Fairway (A Fairy Tale)".

Rieley falsely claimed to have been a Peabody Award and Pulitzer Prize-winning journalist for NBC News. Brian Wilson later wrote a song about Rieley's tendency for falsehoods, titling it "Is Jack Rieley Really Superman?". As of 2014, a recording of the song has not surfaced.

Several months after the release of Holland, Rieley disassociated from the Beach Boys. Ricky Fataar stated, "In the middle of all the in fighting that afflicted the group, Jack was the person trying to hold everything together. [...] Eventually, we realised that Rieley was very much into manipulating the arguments, starting stories and telling tales—a divide and conquer mentality. When that came to light, we had to let him go." Alternatively, biographer Mark Holcomb states that Rieley resigned from the position. Rieley gave his side of the story in a 2013 interview,

Biographer Steven Gaines offered, "It was reportedly noticed by members of the group that Jack's young male assistant seemed to be living with him. Whether the relationship was sexual or not was never determined, but in the homophobic enclave of the Beach Boys, enough of a shadow had been cast. ... Carl made the trip back to Holland and fired Rieley." 

Although there are many books and articles about the Beach Boys, Rieley was rarely interviewed before November 2007 when he was interviewed by Flasher.com in relation to the documentary Dennis Wilson Forever. The first seems to have been in summer 1982, for the UK fanzine Beach Boys Stomp.

Other work
Rieley worked with Kool and the Gang. In 1975, he released a solo album, Western Justice: recorded in the Netherlands in collaboration with Machiel Botman, it dealt with the treatment of the old world powers by the newly emerging third world in the context of a global weather crisis. Rieley took the lead vocal on three songs, including the title track.

In the 1990s Rieley collaborated with several artists including Mark Gardener of the UK group Ride as well as with Jaye Muller and Ben Patton of the writing/production team Muller and Patton. Rieley co-founded the company JFAX Personal Telecom Inc. in 1995 together with Jaye Muller. The company would later be known as J2 Global before acquiring Ziff Davis and adopting that company’s name.

Death
Rieley died on April 17, 2015 while residing in Berlin, Germany. Brian Wilson's social media posted a memorial, attributed to Wilson, which stated, "Sad to hear about Jack Rieley passing away. Jack was our manager in the early 70s and helped us a lot. My thoughts go out to Jack’s family." However, during the filming of the 2021 documentary Brian Wilson: Long Promised Road, Wilson said he had been unaware of Rieley's death, and became visibly upset after being informed of the fact.

References

Bibliography
 

1942 births
2015 deaths
The Beach Boys
Businesspeople from Milwaukee
American music managers
Record producers from Wisconsin
Songwriters from Wisconsin
American expatriates in Germany
20th-century American businesspeople